The 27th Chicago Film Critics Association Awards were announced on December 15, 2014. The awards honor the best in film for 2014. The first round ballots were due on December 11, 2014 and the nominations were announced on December 12. Birdman received the most nominations (9), followed by The Grand Budapest Hotel (8) and Boyhood (7).

Winners and nominees
The winners and nominees for the 27th Chicago Film Critics Association Awards are as follows:

Awards

Awards breakdown
The following films received multiple nominations:

The following films received multiple wins:

References

External links
 

 2014
2014 film awards